Grump or The Grump may refer to:

 A grumpy person.
 The Grump, a 2014 Finnish comedy film featuring the fictional character
 The Grump (fictional character), a fictional Finnish literary character created by Tuomas Kyrö
 "The Grump", a nickname of Bill Jenkins (drag racer) (1930–2012), American engine builder and drag racer
 The nasty title-character in the American cartoon Here Comes the Grump, voiced by Rip Taylor

See also 
 Grumpy (disambiguation)
 Game Grumps, a Let's Play webseries